The Constable of Normandy was a high office of the Duchy of Normandy, who commanded the Duke of Normandy's army. In 1204, the King of France confiscated the Duchy of Normandy and subsumed it into the crown lands of France. Thereafter, the ducal title was held by several French princes.

List of Constables of Normandy

1041 - Raoul de Gacé
1066 - Hagues II de Monfort
1107 - Robert de Montfort
1144 - Richard I du Hommet
1150 - Richard de La Haye
1180 - Guillaume du Hommet
1212-1252 - Guillaume III du Hommet
1252-1253 - Jean I du Hommet
1253-1272 - Jourdain III du Hommet
1272 - Robert de Mortemer
1277 - Guillaume de Mortemer
1283 - Guillaume Crespin
1283 - Guillaume du Bec-Crespin
1382 - Jean II de Melun
1382-1385 - Jean III de Melun
1385-1415 - Guillaume IV de Melun
1417-1423 - Jacques II d'Harcourt
1423-1487 - Guillaume d'Harcourt
1488-1491 - François I d'Orléans-Longueville
1491-1512 - François II d'Orléans-Longueville
1512-1516 - Louis I d'Orléans, duc de Longueville
1516-1524 - Claude d'Orléans-Longueville
1524-1537 - Louis II d'Orléans, Duke of Longueville
1537-1551 - François III d'Orléans, Duke of Longueville
1551-1573 - Léonor d'Orléans, duc de Longueville
1573-1595 - Henri I d'Orléans, duc de Longueville
1595-1663 - Henri II d'Orléans, Duke of Longueville
1663-1669 - Jean Louis Charles d'Orléans-Longueville
1669-1672 - Charles-Paris d'Orléans-Longueville
1726 - Charles I Frédéric de Montmorency-Luxembourg
1726-1764 - Charles II Frédéric de Montmorency-Luxembourg
1764-1799 - Anne Léon II de Montmorency-Fosseux

References

Constables